KAMCO Investment Company KSC (KAMCO) was established in 1998 as a subsidiary of United Gulf Bank (UGB) – the investment banking subsidiary of Kuwait Projects (Holding) Company, i.e., KIPCO and specialises in asset management and financial services in Kuwait and the Middle East and North Africa (MENA). Having increased its share capital from KD 15 million to KD 20 million in June 2003, KAMCO was listed on the Kuwait Stock Exchange (KSE) in October of the same year. KAMCO's current capital stands at KD 26.33 million distributed among 263.3 million shares with a par value of 100 fils each.

References
KAMCO Corporate Website

MENAfn.com Article

Zawya.com Profile

Zawya.com Report

KUNA Article

Ameinfo.com Article

Zawya.com Article

External links

Financial services companies established in 1998
Financial services companies of Kuwait
Investment management companies of Kuwait
Companies listed on the Boursa Kuwait